Balgowan is an area of Dundee, Scotland. The name derives from the Scottish Gaelic Baile Ghobhainn, meaning "blacksmith's stead" (cf also Govan in Glasgow from the same Celtic root).

Notes

Areas of Dundee